Fanny  Efimovna Kaplan (real name Feiga Haimovna Roytblat, ; February 10, 1890 – September 3, 1918) was a Ukrainian Jewish woman, Socialist-Revolutionary, and early Soviet dissident. She was arrested for the attempted assassination of Vladimir Lenin and was executed by the Cheka in 1918.

As a member of the Socialist Revolutionary Party, Kaplan viewed Lenin as a "traitor to the revolution" when the Bolsheviks enacted one-party rule and banned her party. On August 30, 1918, she approached Lenin, who was leaving a Moscow factory, and fired three shots, which badly injured him. Interrogated by the Cheka, she refused to name any accomplices and was executed. The Kaplan attempt and the Moisei Uritsky assassination was used by the government of Soviet Russia for the reinstatement of the death penalty, which had been abolished by the Russian Provisional Government in March 1917.

Early life
Relatively little is known for certain about Kaplan's background. She was born into a Jewish family. Her father was a teacher, and she had seven siblings. There has been confusion about her full name. Vera Figner (in her memoirs, At Women's Katorga), stated that Kaplan's original name was Feiga Khaimovna Roytblat-Kaplan (Фейга Хаимовна Ройтблат-Каплан). However, other sources have stated that her original family name was Roytman (Ройтман), corresponding to the common German and Yiddish surname Reutemann. She was also sometimes known by the given name Dora.

Kaplan was home educated and soon left home to work as a milliner in Odesa. She became a political revolutionary at an early age and joined a socialist group, the Socialist Revolutionaries (SRs). In 1906, when she was 16 years old, Kaplan was arrested in Kyiv over her involvement in a terrorist bomb plot but was captured after a bomb she and her romantic partner were working on accidentally exploded. She was committed for life to the katorga, a hard labour prison camp. She served in the Maltsev and Akatuy prisons of Nerchinsk katorga, Siberia, where she lost her sight, which was partially restored later. She was released on March 3, 1917, after the February Revolution overthrew the imperial government. As a result of her imprisonment, Kaplan suffered from continuous headaches and periods of blindness.

Kaplan became disillusioned with Lenin sometime around 1917, as a result of conflict between the SRs and the Bolsheviks. The Bolsheviks had strong support in the soviets, but in elections to a competing body, the Constituent Assembly, the Bolsheviks failed to win a majority in the November 1917 elections, and a Socialist Revolutionary was elected president in January 1918. The Bolsheviks responded by ordering for the Constituent Assembly to be dissolved. By August 1918 conflicts between the Bolsheviks and their political opponents had led to the banning of most other influential parties, most recently the Left Socialist Revolutionaries (Left SRs), who had been the Bolsheviks' main coalition partner for some time but then organised the Left SR uprising in July because of their opposition to the Treaty of Brest-Litovsk. Kaplan decided to assassinate Lenin because she considered him "a traitor to the Revolution".

Assassination attempt

On August 30, 1918, Lenin spoke at the Hammer and Sickle, an arms factory in southern Moscow. As Lenin left the building and before he had entered his car, Kaplan called out to him. When Lenin turned towards her, she fired three shots with a FN M1900 pistol. One bullet passed through Lenin's coat, and the other two struck him. One passed through his neck, punctured part of his left lung, and stopped near his right collarbone; the other lodged in his left shoulder.

Lenin was taken back to his living quarters at the Kremlin. He feared  that other plotters might be planning to kill him and refused to leave the security of the Kremlin to seek medical attention. Doctors were brought in to treat him but could not remove the bullets outside a hospital. Despite the severity of his injuries, Lenin survived, but his health never fully recovered from the attack.

Execution
There are contradictory stories of her capture. According to the testimony of Deputy Commissar S. N. Batulin, he was within 20 steps of Lenin when he heard three shots and saw Lenin face down on the ground. Afterwards, he identified a woman who he felt looked suspicious and detained her. That turned out to be Kaplan. However, the factory commissar N. I. Ivanov claimed to have arrested her after she had been identified by several children, who had followed her down the street. During interrogation by the Cheka, she made the following statement:

When it became clear that Kaplan would not implicate any accomplices, she was executed in Alexander Garden. The order was carried out by the commander of the Kremlin, the former Baltic sailor P. D. Malkov and a group of Latvian Bolsheviks on September 3, 1918 with a bullet to the back of the head. Her corpse was bundled into a barrel and set alight. The order came from Yakov Sverdlov, who only six weeks earlier had ordered the execution of the tsar and his family. As there were no remains, rumours of her survival in Siberian labor camps persisted for years.

Guilt
Grigory Semyonov, a military commander in the SR who later turned state's evidence against the group, testified in 1922 that Kaplan had been a member of his organization and that he regarded her as the "best person to carry out the attack on Lenin".

Some historians such as Dmitri Volkogonov, Arkady Vaksberg and Donald Rayfield have questioned the actual role of Kaplan in the assassination attempt. Volkogonov suggested that "it is more likely" that Kaplan was actually not the culprit and described her assassination attempt as "another of the many mystifications of Bolshevik history". Vaksberg stated that Lidia Konopleva, another SR, was the culprit and believed that it would be all too comforting that Lenin narrowly avoided being assassinated by a woman whose personality is so far from the stereotype of a national hero. In particular, it had been suggested that she was working on behalf of others and, after her arrest, assumed sole responsibility. The main arguments put forth in that and other versions is that she was nearly blind, and none of the witnesses actually saw her fire the gun. Another argument points to the contradiction between the official Soviet account and official documents, particularly a radiogram by Yakov Peters that mentions the arrest of several suspects, instead of only one. Furthermore, the bullet removed from Lenin's neck after his death was found to have been fired from a weapon other than the one that Kaplan had. Semion Lyandres went so far as to argue that Kaplan was not even a SR.

Legacy

Despite her refusal to name accomplices, the official announcement of the assassination attempt had Sverdlov blame the Right SRs although it denied any involvement. Moisei Uritsky, the People's Commissar for Internal Affairs in the Northern Region and the head of the Cheka in Petrograd, had been assassinated nearly two weeks prior to the attack on Lenin. The Cheka did not find any evidence linking both events, but their occurrence so soon after each other appeared significant in the context of the intensifying civil war. The Bolsheviks' reaction was an abrupt escalation in the persecution of their opponents.

An official decree announcing the Red Terror was issued only hours after the Kaplan shooting and called for an "all-out struggle against enemies of the revolution". In the next few months, about 800 Right SRs and other political opponents of Bolsheviks were executed. During the first year, the scope of the Red Terror expanded significantly.

In fiction 

In the 1939 Soviet film "Lenin in 1918" directed by Mikhail Romm, Natalia Efron portrayed Kaplan.

In the 1934 Hollywood film "British Agent" directed by Michael Curtiz, Corinne Williams and Zozia Tanina portray Kaplan.

In the German (FRG) TV series "Bürgerkrieg in Rußland" (1967), Peggy Parnas portrays Franja Kaplan.

In the 1983 British TV series Reilly, Ace of Spies, Sara Clee portrays Kaplan.

The life of Fanny Kaplan has also been portrayed in a Ukrainian film My Grandmother Fanny Kaplan (2016) directed by Olena Demyanenko.

Kaplan has been the subject of or character in several plays including (Fanny Kaplan by Venedikt Yerofeyev; Kill me, o my beloved! by Elena Isaeva; The Bolsheviks by Mikhail Shatrov) and books (Europe Central by William T. Vollmann).

See also 
 Leonid Kannegisser
 Fritz Platten

References 

  Venedikt Erofeev, 'Fanny Kaplan' 
 Elena Isaeva, 'Kill me, o my beloved'

Further reading
Yuri Felshtinsky, Lenin and His Comrades (New York: Enigma Books, 2010), .

External links

 Fanya Kaplan on Spartacus
 Fanya Kaplan Biography at J-Grit: The Internet Index of Tough Jews
 The location in Moscow where Fanny Kaplan shot Lenin

1890 births
1918 deaths
1918 crimes in Europe
People from Volhynian Governorate
Jews from the Russian Empire
Ukrainian Jews
Jews executed by the Soviet Union
Socialist Revolutionary Party politicians
Executed Soviet women
Failed assassins
People executed for attempted murder
Victims of Red Terror in Soviet Russia
Vladimir Lenin
Soviet assassins
Socialists from the Russian Empire
Jewish socialists
Executed Soviet people
People executed by the Soviet Union by firearm
20th-century women
Female revolutionaries